Laura Gibbs Maczka Jordan was the Mayor of Richardson, Texas from 2013 to 2015. She had previously become the first woman elected to the post of Mayor Pro Tem in the City's 57-year history as a home rule city. Maczka was initially elected to the Richardson City Council, Place 4 in May 2011 as a Republican, defeating Democrat Karl Voigtsberger by 74.97% to 25.03%. She is believed to be only the 6th woman elected to the city council in the last 40 years.

In 2013, Maczka was elected mayor in the first direct election of the mayor since the city became a home rule city in 1956.

In 2015, Maczka became entangled in a corruption scandal involving land developer Mark Jordan, whom she would marry in 2017. Following her resignation, Maczka was convicted of bribery and wire fraud. Her conviction, along with her husband's, was vacated over misconduct allegations by a court bailiff. However, a second jury in 2021 acquitted former mayor of honest services wire fraud and conspiracy to commit honest services wire fraud, charges of which she was convicted during the first trial, instead, convicting her only of bribery and tax fraud. She and her husband were each sentenced to six years in federal prison.

Personal
Maczka was born Laura Gibbs in Liberal, Kansas. Her family moved to Denver, Colorado, during her elementary school years, but by the time she entered 7th grade, her family had relocated to Richardson, Texas.

Maczka married real estate developer Mark Jordan in June 2017 and changed her name to Laura Jordan. She and Mark Jordan each have three children from previous marriages.

Career

Maczka is currently the Executive Director of the Network for Teaching Entrepreneurship (NFTE) Greater Dallas, a non-profit whose mission is to provide programs that inspire young people from low-income communities to stay in school, to recognize business opportunities and to plan for successful 
futures.

Under her leadership, the organization has grown in four years from serving 700 middle and high school students per year to more than 2000. Maczka was previously the Development Officer for St. Luke's Episcopal Hospital/Texas Heart Institute (Houston Texas) and Director of Fund Development for the United Way of the Texas Gulf Coast. 

According to LinkedIn, the Executive Director of NFTE since July 2014 is Karen Ezell. However, Ms Maczka's LinkedIn page still shows herself as having that role as of April 7, 2015.

According to the Local Government Officer Conflicts Disclosure Statement  filed March 19, 2015 by her, Ms. Maczka is now employed by JP Realty Partners/Sooner Management in Leasing, Marketing and Communications.

Political career
Maczka initially served as the Place 4 representative on the Richardson City Council, but switched to run for Place 7 in her campaign for the mayor's spot (Place 7).

City Council Race in 2011
In 2011, Gary Slagel, a 24-year veteran of the Richardson City Council, decided not to run for re-election, 
leaving his seat (Place 4) open. In the ensuing election, Laura Gibbs Maczka and Karl Voigtsberger both ran for the open 
seat. Maczka was endorsed by the Richardson Coalition, a political action group that had supported Slagel, and 
Voigtsberger was supported by the Richardson Citizens Alliance (RCA), a political action group that wanted to 
oust all incumbents. Despite mudslinging and numerous false charges launched by the RCA against the Coalition's slate of candidates, Maczka's and Voigtsberger's race was free of such controversy. She won the election to Place 4 with 5,772 (74.97%) votes to Voigtsberger's 1,927 (25.03%). In 2013, Voigtsberger endorsed Maczka in her campaign for 
mayor.

City Council Race in 2013
On November 27, 2012, Maczka announced her intention to run for mayor. Because of the recent Richardson Charter change that set the mayor's place to be Place 7, Maczka left her current Place 4 open in the 2013 election. Her open place was eventually filled by fellow Councilmember Kendal Hartley (formerly Place 5) in an uncontested race.

On May 11, 2013, Maczka was elected by an overwhelming majority to become the first directly elected mayor in Richardson. Thanks to a Charter change in 2012, the mayor was no longer elected from the Council, but was elected directly by the people. The Charter change set the mayor's place to be Place 7. Maczka won Place 7 by defeating fellow member of the Council Amir Omar by 10,167 to 4,172 (70.90% to 29.10%).

The vote was canvassed (officially accepted) at the May 20, 2013 Council meeting, which marked the beginning of Maczka's term as mayor.

City Council Race in 2015
Mayor Maczka drew no opponents in the 2015 election and would have served two years as mayor. However, on April 2, 2015 she announced she would not serve that term as she posted on Facebook: 'There have been questions about my role as mayor for the City of Richardson for the next term. After much prayer and conversations with my family, I have made the decision that I will not serve as mayor for the 2015–2017 term and intend to submit a declination of such office at the city council meeting at which the election canvass will be conducted. My focus will be on my family, my health and professional career.'

Scandal in 2015
While in office, Mayor Maczka had an affair with Mark Jordan, developer of a highly controversial project in Richardson. The details of the scandal were unclear prior to filing for reelection, which lead to Maczka running unopposed for reelection. However, as the scandal unfolded, many citizens demanded that she resign from office, which she did not do. However, Maczka was forced to not serve the additional term for which she had just been reelected. Moreover, it became public knowledge that she had taken a job with the development company that was in charge of the controversial project which she helped get approved through the city council.

Ethics Investigation 2015
A special called City Council meeting was scheduled for April 28, 2015. The purpose of the meeting was to hear the report of the independent investigator into allegations that  the mayor and/or members of the council violated either state law or the Richardson Code of Ethics or the city charter in terms of the Palisades rezoning development.

In addition, four specific complaints from Richardson citizens were submitted to the Independent Investigator who was chosen by the Richardson City Attorney (as allowed by the City Charter).

Investigation Results
At the April 28, 2015 specially called council meeting, the independent investigator, George A. Staples, presented his report and conclusions on the initial investigation. His summary paragraphs states:

In conclusion, we have found no evidence of any ethical violation under state law, the
City Charter, or the Code of Ethics by Mayor Maczka or any member of the City Council with
respect to the referenced City Council votes or the Mayor's announced intention to decline
another term of office.

Mr. Staples' report goes on to say:

However, the overriding interest of the Code of Ethics as stated in
Section 2-I is to ensure, "that such officers of the City shall at all times strive to avoid even the appearance of impropriety." While the facts in this case do not reveal a cognizable violation of the Code of Ethics, it is certainly understandable that the sum of the Mayor's actions would be viewed by the public as offending the overriding interest of the Code of Ethics. Nevertheless, a failure to avoid the appearance of impropriety does not constitute a violation of the Code of Ethics, City Charter, or state law.

Mr. Staples did note that there was the possibility that the mayor withheld some emails that perhaps had public information that was required to be turned over per the Texas Public Information Act, but that these allegations, if genuine, needed to be followed up by the Public Integrity Unit of the Dallas District Attorney's Office.

Given his report, Mr. Staples said that no action should be taken by the council, and none was.

Then Mr. Staples reported on his investigations of the four complaints lodged against the mayor and the council. He told the council:

After an initial review of the complaints, it was my opinion that they failed to allege a
violation of the Code of Ethics and did not contain any evidence which would constitute a
violation, were vague and lacked detail.

Mr. Staples asked the complainants for follow-up and evidence of wrongdoing, but none was provided. He therefore stated:

It is my opinion that the complaints are insufficient in detail and fail to allege a prima
facie violation of the Code of Ethics.

Again, he recommended that no action be taken by the council, and none was.

After the initial report, Ms. Maczka gave her side of the story. In essence, she  divorced in December 2014, but that she and her ex-husband had worked out an agreement by which she and the children would be able to stay in the house, by having her parents cosign the loan. This support would also have allowed Ms. Maczka to continue to serve as mayor, so, urged by her family, she decided to file to run for re-election.

Ms. Maczka said that it was quite by surprise when several months after the loan process began, the loan company - Wells Fargo - told Ms. Maczka that despite the cosigners, that she herself would have to qualify for the loan based on her income, which at this point was virtually zero. This revelation came after it was too late to drop out of the race.

To complicate matters, Ms. Maczka, who had undergone treatment for melanoma eight years before. It also drove home the point that she had to have health insurance now. These two factors convinced her that she needed to give up the mayor's spot (hence, not take the oath of office, because it was  too late to get off the ballot), and get a job with health benefits immediately. A position  at JP Realty (the company doing the Palisades project for which vote she was criticized) came open, and she took it.

Result of May 2015 Canvass of Votes
On May 18, 2015, the Richardson City Council met to canvass the votes from the May 9th election. "Canvassing" the vote in Texas means that the elected body meets and formally accepts the election report from the local election department.

As previously indicated, Ms. Maczka submitted a letter to the City Secretary declining the office of mayor to which she had been elected. After the other council members had been sworn in, the council elected a new mayor pro tem, who was automatically, per charter changes made in 2012, made mayor. Paul Voelker is now the new mayor of Richardson. Subsequently, Mark Solomon was elected the new mayor pro tem.

Indictment May 2018

On May 10, 2018 Maczka and husband Mark Jordan were indicted for various federal charges including bribery and honest services wire fraud. The indictment says that in exchange for her support of his project, she accepted monetary payments, payments to renovate her house, luxury hotel stays, flight upgrades, meals, a lucrative job, and intimate sexual contact from him.

Conviction March 2019

On March 7, 2019 Maczka and Mark Jordan were found guilty in federal court of four counts of bribery and honest services wire fraud. Maczka remained free on bond pending sentencing while Jordan was taken into custody due to fears he may flee.

Appeal and second trial
In 2020, a court of appeal threw out Maczka's conviction after it emerged that a bailiff had had a conversation with the judge that may have affected the outcome. Prosecutors subsequently filed a new indictment against Maczka and Jordan on federal bribery and tax charges. The trial began on July 6, 2021. After a three-week trial, both defendants were found guilty of bribery, tax fraud and conspiracy. On August 4, 2022, she and Mark Jordan were each sentenced to six years in federal prison.
Candysdirt.com states that both Jordons began serving their terms Oct 24, 2022.

Council  Assignments
 In 2011 to 2013, Maczka was the Council liaison to the Environmental Advisory Commission.
 Maczka also served on both the City Council Education committee and the Chair of the Audit Committee.

State and Local Appointments
 (appointed by Texas Governor Perry) Commission on State Emergency Communications, State of Texas
 Regional Transportation Council
 City of Richardson Parks & Recreation Commission, Vice Chair (appointed 2010) Commissioner (appointed 2007)
 Texas Municipal League Legislative Committee

Other Civic Activities
 Richardson Chamber of Commerce Young Professionals Advisory Committee
 Leadership Richardson, Class XXII (2006 – 2007), Advisor (ROC), (2007-2010) Curriculum Chair, Alumnus/Volunteer of the Year  (2010)
 Leadership Richardson Advisory Board
 Leadership Richardson Alumni Association Board
 Altrusa International
 Friends of Library Board
 Junior League of Houston, Junior League of Richardson, Junior League of Dallas
 RISD Council of PTA's Board and Local PTA Boards (Prairie Creek Elementary, North Junior High, and JJ Pearce 
 High School) – numerous positions including President multiple times, VP Hospitality,  auction chair, VP Ways 
 and Means, Legislative Chair, etc. Received PTA Lifetime Membership Award
 RISD Excellence in Education Foundation Board – various positions held 
 Inside RISD – Charter Class
 Chair, Discovery Point – raised $160,000 in private funds for outdoor classroom in public park
 Texas Recreation and Parks Society (TRAPS) Board, Citizen Branch Chair for the State of Texas
 Co-Chair, Vote YES! Bond Campaign (010) –  successful $66 million campaign

Education
Maczka received a B.S. from Texas A&M University in 1987.

References

External links
City of Richardson official website
Laura Gibbs Maczka 2013 campaign website

Living people
People from Richardson, Texas
People from Liberal, Kansas
Texas A&M University alumni
Texas city council members
Women city councillors in Texas
21st-century American politicians
21st-century American women politicians
1965 births